The Sulak drains most of the mountainous interior of Dagestan northeast into the Caspian Sea. It and most of its branches flow in canyons. Its main tributaries are, from north to southeast:

The Andi Koysu flows north-northeast and joins the Avar Koysu to become the Sulak. A few of its upper tributaries are in Georgia. Near the junction of the two rivers were the Siege of Akhoulgo and the Battle of Gimry.
 
The Avar Koysu flows northeast to join the Andi Koysu, forming the Sulak. Its upper tributaries are the northeast-flowing Khzanor and the northwest flowing Dzhurmut.

North of Gergebil is the Irgan dam and reservoir. Its long upper tributaries include the Karalazuger, Tleyserukh and Risor.
 
The Kazikumukh Koysu flows north and joins the Kara Koysu at Gergebil.

North of the Sulak basin is the Terek basin and south of it is the Samur basin. To the west is the crest of the Main Caucasian Range of the Caucasus Mountains and to the east are many short rivers that flow down into the Caspian.

The Sulak proper starts at the junction of the Andi and Avar Koysus. It flows northeast into the broad Chirkey Reservoir. It then flows northwest through the narrow Miatli canyon and reservoir. Here there are meanders, former channels and canals. The lower Sulak supplies water to Makhachkala through a canal.

In 1735 the Sulak river was stipulated as defining the boundary between the Russian and the Persian empires.

References

Rivers of Dagestan
Tributaries of the Caspian Sea